Renatus is a first name of Latin origin which means "born again" (natus = born). In Italian, Portuguese and Spanish it exists in masculine and feminine forms: Renato and Renata. In French they have been translated to René and Renée. Renata is a common female name in the Czech Republic, Croatia, Lithuania, Poland and Slovakia. The feminine Renate is common in German, Dutch and Norwegian. In Russia the names Renat (usually as Rinat) and Renata are widespread among the Tatar population.

The name has a spiritual meaning, i.e., to be born again with baptism, i.e., from water and the Holy Spirit. It was extensively adopted by early Christians in ancient Rome, due to the importance of baptism. The onomastic is Saint Renatus, a martyr, Bishop of Sorrento in the 5th century, which is celebrated on 6 October.

In Persian Mithraism, which spread widely in the West as a religion of the soldiers and officials under the Roman Empire, persons initiated into its mysteries were designated renatus (with the meaning of regenerated).

With a completely different origin, the name "Renata" is a New Zealand Maori transliteration of the name "Leonard", and is a male's name.

People

Many noted people have this forename:

Renatus
Renatus Cartesius (1596–1650), also known as René Descartes, French philosopher, mathematician, scientist and writer
Publius Flavius Vegetius Renatus, Later Roman Empire writer (4th century)
Renatus Profuturus Frigeridus, historian (5th century)
Renatus of Châlon (1519–1544), Prince of the House of Orange
Renatus Harris (c. 1652–1724), English master organ maker

Renato
 Renato (footballer, born 1944) (Renato Cunha Valle), Brazilian retired goalkeeper
 Renato (footballer, born 1957) (Carlos Renato Frederico), Brazilian retired footballer
 Renato (footballer, born 1979) (Renato Dirnei Florêncio Santos), Brazilian retired footballer
 Renato (footballer, born 1998) (Renato Barbosa Vischi), Brazilian footballer
 Renato Abreu (born 1978), footballer
 Renato Aragão (born 1936), Brazilian comedian and actor
 Renato Archer (1922–1996), Brazilian naval officer and politician
 Renato Augusto (born 1988), footballer
 Renato Bartilotti (born 1976), Mexican actor
 Renato Beghe (born 1933), United States Tax Court judge
 Renato Birolli (1905–1959), Italian painter
 Renato Borghetti (born 1963), Brazilian folk musician and composer
 Renato Brunetta (born 1950), Italian economist and politician
 Renato Caccioppoli (1904–1959), mathematician
 Renato Canova, athletics coach
 Renato Capecchi, Italian opera singer    
 Renato Carosone, Italian pianist
 Renato Cellini, Italian conductor
 Renato Cesarini (born 1906), Italian-Argentine football player and coach
 Renato Chiantoni, Italian actor
 Renato Constantino (1919–1999), Filipino historian
 Renato Corona (1948–2016), Filipino lawyer and former Chief Justice of the Supreme Court of the Philippines
 Renato Corsetti (born 1941), president of the World Esperanto Association 
 Renato Curcio (born 1941), former leader of the Italian Red Brigades
 Renato D'Aiello, Italian saxophonist
 Renato de Albuquerque, Brazilian civil engineer and entrepreneur 
 Renato de Villa (born 1935), Filipino political figure
 Renato del Prado (born 1940), Filipino actor
 Renato Dulbecco (born 1914), virologist
 Renato Gaúcho (born 1962), footballer, real name Renato Portaluppi
 Renato Guttuso (1911–1987), Italian expressionist painter
 Renato Janine Ribeiro, Brazilian political philosopher
 Renato López (born 1983), Mexican television show host and musician
 Renato Leduc Mexican poet and newspaper writer
 Renato Malavasi, Italian actor
 Renato Martino, Italian Cardinal Deacon
 Renato Micallef (born 1951), Maltese pop singer
 Renato Migliorini, Brazilian physician and scientist 
 Renato Naranja, chess master
 Renato Núñez, baseball player
 Renato Pagliari, of the 1980s vocal duo Renée and Renato
 Renato Pirocchi (1933–2002), Italian race car driver
 Renato Pozzetto, Italian comedian
 Renato Ribeiro, Brazilian retired footballer
 Renato Rosaldo, American anthropologist
 Renato Ruggiero (born 1930), Italian politician
 Renato Ruiz, Mexican professional wrestler
 Renato Russo (born 1960–1996), Brazilian singer and composer
 Renato M. E. Sabbatini (born 1947), Brazilian scientist and writer
 Renato Salvatori, Italian movie actor
 Renato Sanches (born 1997), Portuguese international footballer
 Renato Sobral (born 1975), mixed martial arts fighter
 Renato Soru (born 1957), Italian entrepreneur
 Renato Tapia, Peruvian footballer
 Renato Terra, Italian actor and poet
 Renato Vallanzasca, notorious Milanese mobster during the 1970s.
 Renato Villalta (born 1955), Italian basketball player 
 Renato Zanelli, Chilean baritone and tenor

Other
 Renato (album), a 1962 album by Italian singer Mina
 Renato, a main character in the Italian opera Un ballo in maschera

Renata

Renata Adler (born 1938), American journalist and writer
Renata Beger (born 1958), Polish politician
Renata Berkova (born 1975), Czech triathlon athlete
Renata Borgatti (1894–1964), concert pianist
Renata Burgos (born 1982), Brazilian swimmer
Renata Dancewicz (born 1969), Polish actress
Renata Katewicz (born 1965), Polish discus thrower
Renata Končić (born 1977), Croatian singer
Renata Nielsen (born 1966), Danish long jumper
Renata Przemyk (born 1966), Polish singer-songwriter
Renata Ruiz (born 1984), Chilean model 
Renata Scotto (born 1934), opera singer
Renata Soñé, Dominican Republic beauty queen and actress
Renata Strašek (born 1972), Slovenian javelin thrower
Renata Tebaldi (1922–2004), Italian opera singer
Renáta Tolvai (born 1991), Romanian Hungarian singer, dancer and model
Renata Wentzcovitch, Brazilian condensed matter physicist
Cecilia Renata of Austria (1611–1644), Archduchess, daughter of Ferdinand II, Holy Roman Emperor
 Renata, name of the band The Last Goodnight from 1995 to 2006
Trent Renata (born 1988), New Zealand rugby player

Renat
Renat Ataullin (born 1965), Russian footballer
Renat Baratov (born 1991), Russian footballer
Renat Dadashov (born 1999), Azerbaijani footballer
Renat Dubinskiy (born 1979), Kazakhstani footballer
Renat Gafurov (born 1982), Russian motorcycle rider
Renat Gagity (born 1995), Russian footballer
Renat Heuberger (born 1976), Swiss businessman
Renat Kuzmin (born 1967), Ukrainian politician
 Renat Mamashev (born 1983), Russian ice hockey player
Renat Mirzaliyev (born 1982), Ukrainian judoka
Renat Mochulyak (born 1998), Ukrainian footballer
Renat Nelli (1906-1982), French author
Renat Sabitov (born 1985), Russian footballer
Renat Saidov (born 1988), Russian judoka
Renat Sokolov (born 1984), Russian footballer
Renat Yanbayev (born 1984), Russian footballer

As a surname
Elisabet Renat (d. 1752), Swedish industrialist
Grace Renat (born 1949), Mexican actress
Johan Gustaf Renat (1682-1744), Swedish cartographer

Renate
Renate Blauel, music engineer, married to Elton John 
Renate Dorrestein (born 1954), Dutch writer, journalist and feminist
Renate Gebhard (born 1977), Italian jurist and politician
Renate Götschl (born 1975), Austrian alpine skier 
Renate Groenewold (born 1976), Dutch speed skater
Renate Holub (born 1946), political philosopher and social theorist
Renate Klein (born 1945), Australian writer, publisher and feminist health activist
Renate Künast (born 1955), German Minister of Consumer Protection, Food and Agriculture, 2001–2005
Renate Loll, Dutch physicist
Renate Müller (1906–1937), German actress
Renate Schmidt (born 1943), German Social Democratic politician
Renate Sommer (born 1958), German politician and Member of the European Parliament
Renate Stecher (born 1950), German athlete and Olympic champion
Renate Tobies (born 1947), German historian of mathematics
Renate von Natzmer (1898–1935), German noble lady convicted of spying and treason
Silvia Renate Bernadotte (born 1943), Queen consort of King Carl XVI Gustaf of Sweden
Renate Aschauer-Knaup (born 1948), German singer (Amon Düül II)

René

Adrien René Franchet was a French botanist.
Alain-René Lesage
Bernard-René de Launay
François-René de Chateaubriand
Frederic René Coudert, Jr.
Jacques René de Brisay
Jean René Constant Quoy
Louis René Édouard
Louis-René Beaudoin
René & Angela were an 80s R&B duo
René Adler
René Angélil
René Arnoux
René Arped Spitz was a psychiatrist and psychologist.
René Auberjonois
René Auberjonois (painter)
René Barjavel
René Barrientos
René Bazin
René Benjamin
Prosper-René Blondlot was a French physicist
René Blum, a French ballet choreographer
René Blum, a Luxembourgian politician
René Bolf is a Czech footballer
René Boylesve
René Caillié
René Cassin
René Char
René Clair
René Clément
René Coty
René Crevel was a French writer
René Dahinden
René Daumal was a French surrealist writer.
René de Birague
René de Laboulaye
René Descartes
René Dif
René Doumic
René Dreyfus
René Dubos
René Dumont
René Dupéré is a composer from Quebec.
René Echevarria is a television writer and producer.
René Eespere
René Favaloro
René Felber is a Swiss politician.
René Fonck
René Fontaine
René Girard is a French philosopher and historian.
René Goblet
René Goguen
René Goscinny
René Goupil
René Grousset was a French historian.
René Guénon
René Gusperti an Italian swimmer.
René Guyon
René Hardy
René Harris
René Henriksen
René Herse
René Higuita
René Highway was a Canadian dancer and actor.
René I of Naples
René Iché was a French sculptor.
René II of Lorraine
René Jacobs is a Flemish musician.
René Just Haüy
René Laanen
René Lacoste
René Laennec
René Lalique
René Lavand
René Le Bossu
René Leboeuf
René Leibowitz
René Leriche
René Lévesque
René Lohse
René Louis d’Argenson
René Lussier
René Magritte
René Maheu
René Malaise was a Swedish entomologist
René Maran
René Mayer
René McLean is a jazz saxophonist and flutist.
René Moawad
René Monteagudo
René Morin
René Muñoz
René Nicolas de Maupeou
René of Alençon
René of Châlon
René Pétillon
René Piché is a former politician in Ontario, Canada.
René Pleven was a French prime minister
René Pottier
René Préval
René Rachou was a Brazilian physician specialized in malaria
René Rapin
René Réaumur
René Renoult
René Richard Louis Castel
René Robert Cavellier
Rene Russo is an American movie actress
René Schneider
René Simard is a Canadian pop singer from Quebec
René Stockman
René Strickler
René Thirifays
René Thom
René Thomas was a French auto racer.
René van de Kerkhof
René Vandereycken
René Viénet
René Viviani
René Voisin
René Waldeck-Rousseau
René Wellek
René Worms
René, Marquis of Elbeuf
René-Louis Baire
Saint-René Taillandier

As a surname
France-Albert René (born 1935), President of Seychelles, 1977–2004

Renée

Renée of France (1510–1574), daughter of Louis XII, King of France
Renée Adorée (1898–1933), French-American actress
Renée Cox, artist and photographer
Renée Estevez (born 1967), American actress, daughter of actor Martin Sheen
Renée Fleming (born 1959), American soprano singer
Renée Geyer (born 1953), Australian singer
Renée Jones (born 1958), American actress 
Renée Montagne, radio journalist
Renee O'Connor (born 1971), American actress
Renée Richards (born 1934), American ophthalmologist, tennis player, transwoman
Renée Rienne, fictional character on the television series Alias
Renée Soutendijk (born 1957), Dutch actress
Renée Zellweger (born 1969), American film actress

Rinat

Other
575 Renate, a minor planet orbiting the Sun
Hermes & Renato, a Brazilian comedy troupe established in 1999
Renate, Lombardy, a commune in Italy 
Stadio Renato Dall'Ara, stadium in Bologna, Italy  
Stadio Renato Curi, a soccer stadium in Perugia, Italy
1250 René-Lévesque, a skyscraper in Montreal, Canada
Automobiles René Bonnet, French automobile maker
René-Levasseur Island, an island in Lake Manicouagan, Quebec, Canada 
René, Sarthe, a commune in Sarthe, in the department of Loire, France
Renatus (Dynazty album), 2014

de:René
pt:Renato